The Vincentian Family comprises organizations inspired by the life and work of Vincent de Paul, a 17th-century priest who "transformed the face of France."

He directly founded the Confraternities of Charity (today known as the AIC) the Congregation of the Mission and the Daughters of Charity of Saint Vincent de Paul. Frederic Ozanam, inspired by a Daughter of Charity, Rosalie Rendu, founded the Society of St. Vincent de Paul. Betty Ann McNeil, DC, has written a definitive work identifying some 268 institutes that meet at least one criterion as members of the Vincentian Family. The Vincentian Family, inter alia, has, as its incumbent head, Tomaž Mavrič of Buenos Aires, the incumbent worldwide superior general of the Congregation of the Mission, elected during the community's 42nd General Assembly (June 27 – July 15, 2016) in Chicago.

Anglican Communion
In Anglicanism the main Vincentian order for women is the Sisters of Charity, and the main order for men is the Company of Mission Priests. A newly formed priestly congregation, the Sodality of Mary, Mother of Priests (Sodalitas Mariae, Matris Sacerdotum) whose first aspirants took vows in February 2016, has also stated that its intention is to follow a Vincentian Rule.

See also 
 Vincentian Studies Institute at DePaul University, Chicago, US

References

External links 
 St Vincent de Paul Society Wellington
 Vincentian Marian Youth International
 AIC International
 Congregation of the Mission
 Vincentian Academy -- International Baccalaureate Programme
 Daughters of Charity
 Vincentian Family News
 Vincentian Lay Missionaries
 Vincentian Mission Corps

 
Catholic orders and societies
Catholic charities
International charities
Societies of apostolic life